Johann Baptist Orbin (22 September 1806 in Bruchsal – 8 April 1886 in Freiburg im Breisgau) was a German Roman Catholic clergyman. From 1882 until his death he was Archbishop of Freiburg, a post which had been sede vacante for thirteen years after the death of Hermann von Vicari.

References

External links
 

Archbishops of Freiburg
1806 births
1886 deaths
People from Bruchsal